Acestridium scutatum is a species of armored catfish in the genus Acestridium. It is native to the Madeira River basin in Brazil.

References

Fish of Brazil
Hypoptopomatini